Mary Astell (12 November 1666 – 11 May 1731) was an English protofeminist writer, philosopher, and rhetorician. Her advocacy of equal educational opportunities for women has earned her the title "the first English feminist."

Early life 

Few records of Mary Astell's life have survived. As biographer Ruth Perry explains: "as a woman she had little or no business in the world of commerce, politics, or law. She was born, she died; she owned a small house for some years; she kept a bank account; she helped to open a charity school in Chelsea: these facts the public listings can supply." Only four of her letters were saved and these because they had been written to important men of the period. Researching the biography, Perry uncovered more letters and manuscript fragments, but she notes that if Astell had not written to wealthy aristocrats who could afford to pass down entire estates, very little of her life would have survived.

Mary Astell was born in Newcastle upon Tyne on 12 November 1666, to Peter and Mary (Errington) Astell. Her parents had two other children, William, who died in infancy, and Peter, her younger brother. She was baptised in St John's Church in Newcastle. Her family was upper-middle class and lived in Newcastle throughout her early childhood. Her father was a coal merchant and a conservative royalist Anglican. Mary received no formal education, although she did receive an informal education from her uncle Ralph Astell; he was a Cambridge graduate and a former clergyman whose alcoholism had prompted his suspension from the Church of England. Though suspended from the Church, he was affiliated with the Cambridge-based philosophical school that based its teachings around philosophers such as Aristotle, Plato, and Pythagoras. Her father died when she was 12 years old, leaving her without a dowry.  With the remainder of the family finances invested in her brother's higher education, Mary and her mother moved to live with Mary's aunt.

Career 

After the death of her mother and aunt in 1688, Astell moved to Chelsea, London, where she became acquainted with a circle of literary and influential women, including Lady Mary Chudleigh, Elizabeth Thomas, Judith Drake, Elizabeth Elstob, and Lady Mary Wortley Montagu. These helped develop and publish her work, as did William Sancroft, previously Archbishop of Canterbury. Believing himself bound by his previous oath to James II, he refused to swear allegiance to William III after the 1688 Glorious Revolution and became a Nonjuror. He provided financial support and an introduction to her future publisher; Astell later dedicated a collection of poetry to him.

She was one of the first English women, following Bathsua Makin, to advocate the idea that women were just as rational as men, and just as deserving of education. First published anonymously and signed "By a Lover of her Sex" in 1694, her A Serious Proposal to the Ladies for the Advancement of their True and Greatest Interest presents a plan for an all-female college where women could pursue a life of the mind. In 1697 she published part 2 to her A Serious Proposal" Wherein a Method is offered for the Improvement of their Minds".

In 1700, Astell published Some Reflections upon Marriage. She wittily critiques the philosophical underpinnings of the institution of marriage in 1700s England, warning women of the dangers of a hasty or ill-considered choice. The Duchess of Mazarin is used as an example of "the dangers of an ill Education and unequal Marriage". Astell argues that education will help women to make better matrimonial choices and meet the challenges of the married state: "She has need of a strong Reason, of a truly Christian and well-temper'd Spirit, of all the Assistance the best Education can give her, and ought to have some good assurance of her own Firmness and Vertue, who ventures on such a Trial".

Astell warns that disparity in intelligence, character, and fortune may lead to misery, and recommends that marriage be based on lasting friendship rather than short-lived attraction. A woman should look for "a good Understanding, a Vertuous Mind, and in all other respects let there be as much equality as may be." Astell expanded on this theme in response to critics in the third edition of Some Reflections upon Marriage.

She withdrew from public life in 1709 to become head of a charity school for girls in Chelsea, funded by two wealthy philanthropists, Lady Catherine Jones and Lady Elizabeth Hastings. Backed by the Society for the Propagation of Christian Knowledge, Astell designed the school's curriculum and it is thought to be the first school in England with an all-women Board of Governors. When she was 60 years old, Astell went to live with Lady Catherine Jones, with whom she resided until her death in 1731.

Astell died in London a few months after a mastectomy to remove a cancerous right breast. In her last days, she refused to see any of her acquaintances and stayed in a room with her coffin, thinking only of God; she was buried in the churchyard of Chelsea Church in London.

Astell is remembered for her ability to debate freely with both contemporary men and women, and particularly for her groundbreaking methods of negotiating the position of women in society by engaging in philosophical debate (Descartes was a particular influence) rather than basing her arguments in historical evidence as had previously been attempted. Descartes' theory of dualism, a separate mind and body, allowed Astell to promote the idea that women, as well as men, had the ability to reason, and subsequently, they should not be treated so poorly: "If all Men are born Free, why are all Women born Slaves?"

Books

All of Mary Astell's works were published anonymously. Astell's two best-known books, A Serious Proposal to the Ladies, for the Advancement of Their True and Greatest Interest (1694) and A Serious Proposal, Part II (1697), outline her plan to establish a new type of institution for women to assist in providing women with both religious and secular education. She suggests extending women's career options beyond mother and nun. She felt uneducated women were concerned with beauty and vanity, and this lack of education was the root of their inferiority to men, not that they were naturally inferior. Astell wanted all women to have the same opportunity as men to spend eternity in heaven with God, and she believed that for this they needed to be educated and to understand their experiences. The 'nunnery' style education she proposed would enable women to live in a protected environment, without the influences of the external patriarchal society.

Her proposal was never adopted because critics said it seemed "too Catholic" for the English. Later her ideas about women were satirised in The Tatler by the writer Jonathan Swift. While the writer Daniel Defoe admired the first part of Astell's proposal, he believed that her recommendations were "impracticable." However, Patricia Springborg notes that Defoe's own recommendation for an academy for women as detailed in his An Essay Upon Projects did not significantly differ from Astell's original proposal. Despite this, she was still an intellectual force in London's educated classes.

A few years later, Astell published the second part of A Serious Proposal, detailing her own vision of women's education for courtly ladies. She broke away from the contemporary rhetorical style of the period where orators spoke before an audience for learning, and instead offered a conversational style of teaching "neighbours" the proper way of behaviour. She referred only to the Port-Royal Logic as a source of contemporary influence, though still relied upon classical rhetorical theories as she presented her own original ideas. In her presentation, she offered that rhetoric, as an art, does not require a male education to be master, and listed the means of which a woman could acquire the necessary skills from natural logic, which established Astell as a capable female rhetorician.

In the early 1690s Astell entered into correspondence with John Norris of Bemerton, after reading Norris's Practical Discourses, upon several Divine subjects. The letters illuminate Astell's thoughts on God and theology. Norris thought the letters worthy of publication and had them published with Astell's consent as Letters Concerning the Love of God (1695). Her name did not appear in the book, but her identity was soon discovered and her rhetorical style was much lauded by contemporaries.

Themes

Friendship 
One of Astell's notable contributions to 18th-century ideas of female friendship rests on the political exigencies of forming alliances. Jacqueline Broad views Astell's bond of friendship as more Aristotelian where alliances are formed for the sake of virtuous reciprocity. However, Nancy Kendrick does not accept Broad's viewpoint. She feels Astell's "theory of friendship is determinedly anti-Aristotelian." Although Astell embraced the Aristotelian friendship of moral virtue, Kendrick claims that Astell treated "virtuous friends as those who love one another for who they essentially are" and not just for reciprocity's sake. Contrary to Aristotle, Astell contends that authentic virtuous friendship arose from the Divine Nature of God, thus becoming spiritual friendship. Furthermore, Astell, unlike Aristotle, saw this love in friendship extending toward one's enemies because Divine Love embraces all of mankind.

However, her emphasis on religion's importance to female friendship and feminist thought has rankled contemporary critics of her work.

Astell considered herself a self-reliant, modern female; one who was on a definite mission to rescue her sex from the oppression of males.

Education for women 
Having never received a formal education, Astell believed that women should be educated in a spiritual environment, away from society with only other females. She felt the world was so corrupt because of being under male dominance that women should receive an education free of male influence. Although she suggested creating a school for women in her first proposal, she never saw its creation in her lifetime.

Astell argued that women should receive an education equal to men and should be able to refrain from marrying if they so desire. However, if they should marry, then they must be subjected to the will of their husbands.

Marriage

Astell viewed herself as self-reliant and took pride advancing her mission to rescue her sex without the help of male authority, whom she felt kept women in a place of subjugation.

George Ballard, Astell's eighteenth-century biographer, stated that although she never married, she had been proposed to by an eminent clergyman but the marriage negotiations broke down, leaving Astell disappointed.

Religion and politics

Astell makes jabs at John Locke critiquing An Essay Concerning Human Understanding and The Reasonableness of Christianity, along with other works she regards as deist or Socinian. She attacks his scepticism of the scriptural truth and divinity of Jesus Christ, objecting strongly that Christ is merely an 'extraordinary person,' and that there is no difference between the Christian and Islamic belief in God. In sections 2 and 3 of The Christian Religion, Astell focused on "Duty to God" and "Duty to Our Neighbour," Astell presents all humans 'are brethren' and sinful pride leads us to treat others as 'creatures of a different species.' This thought rests alongside her beliefs in the essential nature of hierarchical distinctions, which she explains by stating that God's works 'do not necessarily possess the same degree of perfection.'

Having been exposed in her youth to violent political situations such as civil unrest and riots in the streets of Newcastle is probably what helped develop her interest in politics. She had idealised King Charles I and viewed his successors, William and Mary, as "illegitimate" rulers to the throne of England. Her Tory politics and English patriotism led her to reflect that 'it is better some innocents should suffer than the majesty of government, and herein the divine authority should be violated."

List of works 

 A Serious Proposal to the Ladies for the Advancement of their True and Greatest Interest. By a Lover of Her Sex. 1694, 1695, 1696 1697 (two printings), 1701, 1703
 Some Reflections Upon Marriage, Occasioned by the Duke and Dutchess of Mazarine's Case; Which is Also Considered. London: Printed for John Nutt, near Stationers-Hall, 1700 1700, Also: 1703, 1706, 1730 (two editions) 
 A Fair Way with Dissenters and their Patrons. Not writ by Mr. L – - – - – y, or any other Furious Jacobite, whether Clergyman or Layman; but by a very Moderate Person and Dutiful Subject to the Queen. 1704
 An Impartial Enquiry into the Causes of Rebellion and Civil War in this Kingdom: In an examination of Dr. Kennett’s sermon, 31 Jan. 1703/4. And Vindication of the Royal Martyr. 1704
 The Character of the Wisest Men. Re-printed and published by the Author’s Friends. 1704
 Moderation Truly Stated: or, a review of a late pamphlet, entitul’d Moderation a virtue, or the occasional conformist justify’d from the imputation of hypocricy. Wherein this justification is further consider’d, …. 1704
 Letters concerning the love of God, between the author of the proposal to the ladies and Mr. John Norris: Wherein his late Discourse, shewing, That it ought to be intire and exclusive of all other Loves, is further Cleared and Justified. Published by J. Noris, M. A. Rector of Bemerton near Sarum. The second edition, corrected by the authors, with some few things added. 1705, 1730
 The Christian religion, as profess’d by a daughter of the Church of England. 1705, 1717, 1730
 Bart’lemy Fair: or an enquiry after with: in which due respect is had to a letter concerning enthusiasm, to my Lord ***. By Mr. Wotton. 1709
 An enquiry after wit: wherein the trifling arguing and impious raillery of the late Earl of Shaftesbury, in his Letter concerning enthusiasm, and other profane writers, are fully answer’d and justly exposed. 1722
 . 1696 (two editions), 1697
 (Attributed) Six familiar essays upon marriage, crosses in love, sickness, death, loyalty, and friendship, written by a lady. 1696

Legacy

Astell had a significant personal library which was an unusual example of a late seventeenth- and early eighteenth-century book collection owned by a woman who was a published author. Her books can be recognised by the inscription of her name on the tile page and her many annotations.

In 2021 a collection of 47 of Astell's books and pamphlets, many of which have her annotations, were identified in the Old Library at Magdalene College, Cambridge by Catherine Sutherland, the Deputy Librarian. These marginalia reveal, for the first time, the degree to which she was involved with the natural philosophy literature and discourse of her time. Other holdings are at the British Library and the Northamptonshire Record Office.

The Mary Astell Academy (formerly Linhope PRU) in Linhope Road, Newcastle upon Tyne, is named after her. There is also a Mary-Astell-Straße in Bremen, Germany.

References

Bibliography 

 
 Astell, Mary. The Christian Religion, as Professed by a Daughter of the Church of England. Ed. Jacqueline Broad. Toronto: CRRS and Iter, 2013. .
 Astell, Mary. A Serious Proposal to the Ladies. Ed. Patricia Springborg. Peterborough: Broadview Press, 2002. .
 Broad, Jacqueline. The Philosophy of Mary Astell: An Early Modern Theory of Virtue. Oxford: Oxford University Press, 2015. .
 
 Hill, Bridget. The First English Feminist: "Reflections Upon Marriage" and Other Writings by Mary Astell. Aldershot: Gower Publishing, 1986.
 Hill, Bridget. "A Refuge from Men: The Idea of a Protestant Nunnery". Past and Present 117 (1987): 107–30.
 James, Regina. "Mary, Mary, Quite Contrary, Or, Mary Astell and Mary Wollstonecraft Compared". Studies in Eighteenth Century Culture 5 (1976): 121–39.
 Perry, Ruth. The Celebrated Mary Astell: An Early English Feminist. Chicago: University of Chicago Press, 1986. .
 
 Smith, Florence M. Mary Astell. New York: Columbia University Press, 1916.
 Springborg, Patricia. Mary Astell (1666–1731), Political Writings. Cambridge: Cambridge University Press, 1996.
 Springborg, Patricia. "Mary Astell and John Locke," in Steven Zwicker (ed.), The Cambridge Companion to English Literature, 1650 to 1750. Cambridge: Cambridge University Press, 1998.
 Springborg, Patricia, Mary Astell: Theorist of Freedom from Domination (Cambridge, Cambridge University Press, 2005).
 Stone Stanton, Kamille. "'Affliction, the Sincerest Friend': Mary Astell’s Philosophy of Women’s Superiority through Martyrdom." Prose Studies: History, Theory, Criticism.  Special Issue: The Long Restoration. Vol. 29.1. Spring, 2007, pp. 104–114.
"‘Capable of Being Kings’: The Influence of the Cult of King Charles I on the Early Modern Women's Literary Canon." New Perspectives on the Eighteenth Century.  Vol 5.1. Spring 2008, pp. 20–29.
 Sutherland, Christine. The Eloquence of Mary Astell. University of Calgary Press, 2005.
 Mary Astell: Reason, Gender, Faith. Edited by William Kolbrener and Michal Michelson. Aldershot, 2007, 230 pp.

External links

 
Mary Astell (1666-1731), Project Vox

Mary Astell, Internet Encyclopedia of Philosophy

Mary Astell(1666–1731) at Great Voyages: History of Western Philosophy
Excerpts from Astell's works
Project Continua: Biography of Mary Astell
 
Mary Astell episode of In Our Time from 5 November 2020.

1666 births
1731 deaths
17th-century English educators
17th-century English women writers
17th-century English writers
17th-century philosophers
18th-century English educators
18th-century British philosophers
18th-century English women writers
18th-century English writers
18th-century English non-fiction writers
British women's rights activists
English educational theorists
English feminists
English feminist writers
English rhetoricians
English philosophers
English women activists
English women non-fiction writers
Feminism and history
Feminist studies scholars
People from Newcastle upon Tyne
17th-century pseudonymous writers
18th-century pseudonymous writers
Pseudonymous women writers